Oy-Tal is a village in Osh Region of Kyrgyzstan. It is part of the Kara-Kulja District. Its population was 2,076 in 2021. It is located to the east of the Alai Mountains and towards the west of the Tian Shan mountain range.

Nearby villages include Köndük (5 km), Terek (11 km) and Kara-Tash.

References

External links
Satellite map at Maplandia.com

Populated places in Osh Region